The basin tree frog (Boana lanciformis) is a species of frog in the family Hylidae found in Bolivia, Brazil, Colombia, Ecuador, Peru, and Venezuela. Its natural habitats are subtropical or tropical moist lowland forests, subtropical or tropical swamps, rivers, freshwater lakes, freshwater marshes, intermittent freshwater marshes, rural gardens, and heavily degraded former forests.

References

Boana
Amphibians of Bolivia
Amphibians of Brazil
Amphibians of Colombia
Amphibians of Ecuador
Amphibians of Peru
Amphibians of Venezuela
Amphibians described in 1870
Taxonomy articles created by Polbot